Dana Glover may refer to:

Dana Glover (born 1974), American female pop singer and songwriter known for performing film songs
Dana Karl Glover (born 1958), American male trumpet player and music composer for video games